İhsaniye District is a district of Afyonkarahisar Province of Turkey. Its seat is the town İhsaniye. Its area is 849 km2, and its population is 27,455 (2021).

Composition
There are 5 municipalities in İhsaniye District:
 Döğer
 Gazlıgöl
 İhsaniye
 Kayıhan
 Yaylabağı

There are 26 villages in İhsaniye District:

 Ablak
 Aşağıtandır
 Ayazini
 Basırlar
 Bayramaliler
 Beyköy
 Bozhüyük
 Cumalı
 Demirli
 Eskieymir
 Eynehankuzviran
 Hacıbeyli
 İğdemir
 Kadımürsel
 Karacaahmet
 Kıyır
 Muratlar
 Oğulbeyli
 Orhanlı
 Osmanköy
 Sarıcaova
 Üçlerkayası
 Yenice
 Yeşilyayla
 Yiğitpınarı
 Yukarıtandır

References

Districts of Afyonkarahisar Province